Dorcadion insulare is a species of beetle in the family Cerambycidae. It was described by Kraatz in 1883. It is known from Greece.

References

insulare
Beetles described in 1883